Bayman, in Iran, may refer to:
 Bayman-e Ariyez
 Bayman Sadat